Disarmament Conference is a 1931 short animated film distributed by Columbia Pictures, and part of the long-running film series featuring Krazy Kat.

Plot
Krazy, wearing a safari hat, is driving a car, traveling through the African jungles. Suddenly his vehicle is being attacked by projectiles from within the area. It appears there is a battle involving various animals. The animals fight by using their natural attributes (such as monkeys hurling coconuts, and skunks using their strong foul odor). Although his car is destroyed, Krazy is unharmed, and tries to take cover. Having enough of the frenzy, Krazy tells the animals to stop and gather around. And as they come to him, Krazy presents a treaty signed by him, stating that the animals should give up their violent ways, and therefore live peacefully. The animals are persuaded as they disarm themselves (such as a lion removing his choppers, and an elephant removing his tusks). They, along with Krazy, then celebrate, in a song and dance.

But not all the animals received Krazy's message. The hornets from a tree notice peace going around. The hornets, however, see this as an opportunity to retaliate as they come out from the nest in a large number before attacking the other animals. The frightened animals take shelter in a cave, and seal its entrance. Krazy, who is still outside, tries to get in. Although someone opens up, that animal just pushes him away. Krazy then resorts to fleeing on a floating rock in a river. But to his surprise, the rock is actually a crocodile.

Song
The song Happy Days Are Here Again is featured in the film. It would later be used again in Seeing Stars and Prosperity Blues.

See also
 Krazy Kat filmography

References

External links
Disarmament Conference at the Big Cartoon Database
 

1931 films
American animated short films
American black-and-white films
1931 animated films
Krazy Kat shorts
Columbia Pictures short films
1930s American animated films
Films set in Africa
Films set in jungles
Columbia Pictures animated short films
Screen Gems short films